Mission Against Terror, also known as M.A.T, is a multiplayer, free-to-play FPS. Launched into closed beta by Suba Games on September 3, 2010, it quickly got the attention of many MMO media sites to giveaway closed beta keys. Mission Against Terror entered into open beta on September 19, 2010, followed by its commercial launch on July 8, 2011.

Gameplay 
Mission Against Terror is similar to commercial games such as Counter-Strike, Call of Duty, and Ghost Recon 2. The game offers quite a few different modes of gameplay including deathmatch and team deathmatch, along with unique game modes against computer-controlled bots such as AI Mode, Dragon Emperor Mode, Hybrids, Inferno(I-II), Bounty Mode, Snake mode, Phantom Team, Mummy mode (Hero), Inferno II, Hide & Seek, Mummy mode and more. Mission Against Terror includes a variety of real-world weaponry, like the FAMAS, M4A1, AK47, Heckler & Koch HK416 the Heckler & Koch MP5.

The Arrow keys  ←↑↓→ and [AWSD] controls movements while the mouse is used to look around and aim.

M.A.T availability by country  
 MAT Mission Against Terror By Subagame - USA and Canada (No longer available)
 MAT Mission Against Terror 2 - Malaysia and Singapore
 Xoyo Mission Against Terror - China (No longer available)
 Attack Online - Cambodia
 Xshot Australia (No longer available)
 Xshot Thailand
 Xshot Taiwan (No longer available)

References

External links 
 Mission Against Terror 2 (MAT2)
 Official Mission Against Terror (M.A.T) Website by Suba Games
 Mission Against Terror - China (Xoyo)
 Xshot Thailand
 Xshot Indonesia
 Attack online (AK2)
 Xshot Taiwan (X行動)
 Xshot Australia
 Infiplay Russia
 Head Shot Online Hong Kong
2011 video games
First-person shooter multiplayer online games
Free-to-play video games
Multiplayer video games
Video games developed in China
Windows games
Windows-only games
Suba Games games